La serva padrona, or The Maid Turned Mistress, is a 1733 intermezzo by Giovanni Battista Pergolesi (1710–1736) to a libretto by Gennaro Federico, after the play by Jacopo Angello Nelli. It is some 40 minutes long, in two parts without overture, and was written as light-hearted staged entertainment between the acts of Pergolesi's serious opera Il prigionier superbo. More specifically each of the two parts, set in the same dressing room, played during an intermission of the three-act opera to amuse people who remained in their seats. 

Federico's libretto was also set by Giovanni Paisiello, in 1781.

Performance history
La serva padrona and the opera seria it punctuates were premiered at the Teatro San Bartolomeo on 6 September 1733, the first performances there after an earthquake the previous year in Naples had closed all theatres. Both were written for the birthday of Holy Roman Empress Elisabeth Christine of Brunswick-Wolfenbüttel a few days earlier.

Il prigioniero superbo was unsuccessful in its day but has been staged in the composer's home town of Jesi several times and recorded there in 1997, 1998 and 2009, being filmed during the latter year. But La serva padrona was an immediate hit and became its own stand-alone work. Audiences found it appealing for its relatable characters: wily maid versus aging master. More significantly it became a model for the opera buffa genre and a quintessential piece bridging the Baroque and the Classical periods. With a new finale its French version provided the catalyst for the infamous Querelle des Bouffons.

Roles

Synopsis

Part 1 – dressing room

Uberto, an elderly bachelor, is angry and impatient with his maidservant, Serpina, because she has not brought him his chocolate today. Serpina has become so arrogant that she thinks she is the mistress of the household. Indeed, when Uberto calls for his hat, wig and coat, Serpina forbids him from leaving the house, adding that from then on he will have to obey her orders. Uberto thereupon orders Vespone to find him a woman to marry so that he can rid himself of Serpina.

Part 2 – same dressing room

Serpina convinces Vespone to trick Uberto into marrying her. She informs Uberto that she is to marry a military man named Tempesta. She will be leaving his home and apologizes for her behavior. Vespone, disguised as Tempesta, arrives and, without saying a word, demands 4,000 crowns for a dowry. Uberto refuses to pay such a sum. Tempesta threatens him to either pay the dowry or marry the girl himself. Uberto agrees to marry Serpina. Serpina and Vespone reveal their trick; but Uberto realizes that he has loved the girl all along. They will marry after all; and Serpina will now be the true mistress of the household.

Musical numbers
Part 1
Aria: Aspettare e non venire (Uberto)
Recitativo: Quest'è per me disgrazia (Uberto, Serpina)
Aria: Sempre in contrasti (Uberto)
Recitativo: In somma delle somme (Serpina, Uberto)
Aria: Stizzoso, mio stizzoso (Serpina)
Recitativo: Benissimo. Hai tu inteso? (Uberto, Serpina)
Duetto: Lo conosco a quegli occhietti (Serpina, Uberto)
Part 2
Recitativo: Or che fatto ti sei (Serpina, Uberto)
Aria: A Serpina penserete (Serpina)
Recitativo: Ah! quanto mi sa male (Uberto, Serpina)
Aria: Son imbrogliato io già (Uberto)
Recitativo: Favorisca, signor, passi (Serpina, Uberto)
Duetto finale (†): Contento tu sarai (Serpina, Uberto)
(†It later became customary to replace this final duet with another: Per te ho io nel core. This the composer wrote two years later, in 1735, for his commedia per musica, Il Flaminio.)

Scores
The scores of the opera vary. Edwin F. Kalmus has one with massive omissions, wrong notes, and much spoken dialogue. Boosey & Hawkes has the score in an operetta adaptation by Seymour Barab, with highly simplified accompaniment and much spoken dialogue. Casa Ricordi presents the opera as sung through; it is the version most used. W. W. Norton & Company includes excerpts of the full score (for strings and continuo) that have numerous melodic differences from the Ricordi edition but correlate with the recording with Siegmund Nimsgern.

Recordings and films
Simonetto/Tuccari/Sesto Bruscantini, live in Capri, 1948, Cetra
Pedrollo/Erato/Bacci, 1949, Polydor Vox
Carlo Maria Giulini/Carteri/Nicola Rossi-Lemeni, 1955, Columbia
Ferdinand Leitner/Mazzoleni/Cortis, 1955, Archiv
Serra-G/Colorni/Rovetta, 1956, RCA
FILM: Ferrara/Anna Moffo/Paolo Montarsolo, 1958 Mario Lanfranchi movie, View Video (label)
Virginia Zeani opposite her husband Rossi-Lemeni conducted by Singer, 1959, Vox
Renata Scotto and Bruscantini conducted by Fasano, 1960, Ricordi
Mariella Adani and Leonardi Monreale, Pomeriggi Musicali del Teatro Nuovo di Milano, Ettore Gracis conducting, 1960, Club Français du Disque; later Nonesuch Records H-71043
Bugeanu/Petrescu-Cironeanu/Rintzler, 1961, Electrecord
FILM: Australian TV movie with June Bronhill, 1962
Maier/Bonifaccio/Siegmund Nimsgern and the Collegium Aureum, 1969, BASF; later Deutsche Harmonia Mundi
Koch-H/Miljaković/Süß, 1970, Telefunken
Ros Marbà/Carmen Bustamante/Renato Capecchi, 1973, Ensayo
Alberto Zedda/Celine/Bruscantini, 1974, Vedette Quadrifoglio
Gordana Minov-Jevtović and Nikola Mitić, 1976, PGP RTB
Németh/Katalin Farkas/József Gregor and the Capella Savaria, 1985, Hungaroton
Palmer-R/Julianne Baird/John Ostendorf, 1989, Omega
Hirsch/Bima/Salomaa, live in Waldkirch, 1990, Arts (label)
Mason/Bunning/Donnelly, 1992, Meridian Records
Bezzina/Isabelle Poulenard/Cantor, 1995, Pierre Verany
FILM: Sigiswald Kuijken/Patricia Biccirè/Donato di Stefano and La Petite Bande, live in Brussels, 1996, Accent ACC 96123 D and TDK DVD
FILM: Magnani/Sylvia Klein/José Carlos Leal, 1997 Carla Camurati movie, Elimar Produções Artisticas, Brazil
Marcello Panni/Scano/de Simone, live in Jesi, 1997, Bongiovanni
Gustav Kuhn/Antonucci-P/di Stefano-D, live in Jesi, 1998, Arte Nova
Clemente/Cozzoli/Govi, live in Bitonto, 1999, Kicco Classics
Dallara/Zanello/Govi, 2006, Tactus Records
FILM: Diego Fasolis/Sonya Yoncheva/Furio Zanasi, 2008 Swiss TV movie
Deliso/Zyatkova/Torriani, 2011, Da Vinci
FILM: Rovaris/Marianelli/Lepore, filmed in Jesi, 2011, Arthaus
Scogna/Nisi/Benetti, 2013, Tactus Records
Scogna/Liuzzi/di Gioia, 2017, Brilliant Classics

References
Notes

Sources
 Grout, Donald Jay and Hermine Weigel Williams (2003), A Short History of Opera, Columbia University Press, pp. 229–232. 
 Palisca, Claude V. Norton Anthology of Western Music: Volume 2: Classic to Modern. New York: W. W. Norton, 2001 
 Warrack, John and Ewan West (1992) The Oxford Dictionary of Opera.

External links

Librettos

Scores
 at University of North Texas

Italian-language operas
Opera buffa
Intermezzi
Operas
1733 operas
Operas by Giovanni Battista Pergolesi